The Eisner Award for Best Adaptation from Another Medium is an award for "creative achievement" in American comic books.

History and name change
The award was launched in 2010 as Best Adaptation from Another Work. No award was given in 2011. In 2012 the award was renamed to Best Adaptation from Another Medium. No award was given in 2015 or 2017.

Winners and nominees

References

Category
2010 establishments in the United States
Annual events in the United States
Awards established in 2010
Adaptation